On 2 January 2022, 23 people were killed in clashes between far-left guerrilla groups in Arauca Department, Colombia. The National Liberation Army (ELN) clashed with Revolutionary Armed Forces of Colombia (FARC) dissidents near the border with Venezuela.

FARC agreed to a ceasefire in 2016, but there are around 5,000 dissidents currently operating. There are about 2,500 active ELN members. Colombia is the world's largest producer of cocaine; the two militant groups clash due to fighting over control of the large illegal drug trade.

See also
2021 Apure clashes

References

2022 murders in Colombia
2022 in Colombia
2022 mass shootings in South America
21st-century mass murder in South America
2022 clashes
Battles in 2022
FARC actions
January 2022 crimes in South America
January 2022 events in Colombia
Mass murder in 2022
Mass murder in Colombia
Terrorist incidents in South America in 2022
Terrorist incidents in Colombia in the 2020s
2022 crimes in Colombia
Attacks in South America in 2022